The Prince of Wales Stakes is a Canadian Thoroughbred horse race run annually at Fort Erie Race Track in Fort Erie, Ontario. Restricted to only three-year-old horses bred in Canada, it is contested on dirt over a distance of  miles (1.9 km;  furlongs). In 1959, the Prince of Wales Stakes became the second race in the Canadian Triple Crown series. It follows the June running of the King's Plate and precedes the Breeders' Stakes in August.

The race was inaugurated in 1929 at the now defunct Thorncliffe Park Raceway in today's Thorncliffe Park neighbourhood of central east Toronto.

Historical notes
In 1959, the E.P. Taylor colt New Providence emerged as a Triple Crown champion in its first year of existence. In the ensuing years, six more three-year-olds have equaled the feat. In 2014, it was decided to grandfather the five horses who had won the series prior to 1959 as well.

According to the racetrack's website, for fans, the most popular winner of the race was the Canadian and American Hall of Fame filly Dance Smartly who went on to win the 1991 Triple Crown.

In 1995 Barbara J. Minshall became the first woman to train the winner of a Canadian Triple Crown race when the Minshall Farms colt Kiridashi won. To date, no female jockey has won  the Prince of Wales Stakes, although Francine Villeneuve and Autumn Snow lost the 2005 running by a nose to Ablo.

Uniquely, the 2003 edition featured the first "father vs. daughter" match up in a Canadian Triple Crown race, when jockeys David Clark and Cory Clark competed against one another. He finished third aboard Shoal Water, while she brought her horse, Sonofawac, home in sixth position.

From 1959 through 1987 the Prince of Wales Stakes was run on turf. Since inception, it has been contested at four different Ontario racetracks and at various distances:
  miles : 1929–1930 at Thorncliffe Park Raceway, 1957–1958 at Woodbine Racetrack
  miles : 1932–1942 and  1947–1952 at Thorncliffe Park Raceway, 1944–1945 and 1953–1955 at Old Woodbine Racetrack, 1956 at Woodbine Racetrack
  miles : 1959–1975 at Fort Erie Racetrack
  miles : 1976–1987 at Fort Erie Racetrack
  miles : 1988–present at Fort Erie Racetrack

Records
Speed record: (at current distance of  miles)
 1:53.80 – Bruce's Mill (1994)

Most wins by a jockey:
 5 – Hugo Dittfach (1960, 1962, 1963, 1966, 1967)

Most wins by a trainer:
 7 – Gordon J. McCann (1951, 1952, 1954, 1959, 1961, 1963, 1967)

Most wins by an owner:
 9 – E. P. Taylor and/or Windfields Farm (1951, 1952, 1954, 1959, 1961, 1963, 1967, 1972, 1988)

Winners

A † designates a Triple Crown winner.

Broadcasting
TSN owns broadcast rights to the event. It has carried the race intermittently due to the lack of consistent sponsorship; the race will air on TSN in 2018 through a sponsorship with the Ontario Lottery and Gaming Corporation.

References

 Toronto Star article on the 2009 Prince of Wales Stakes

External links
 

Restricted stakes races in Canada
Fort Erie Race Track
Flat horse races for three-year-olds
Triple Crown of Thoroughbred Racing
Recurring sporting events established in 1929
1929 establishments in Ontario
Summer events in Canada